Essam Kamal Tawfiq El Hadary (born 15 January 1973) is an Egyptian goalkeeping coach and former professional footballer.

Nicknamed the "High Dam", El Hadary spent the largest portion of his club career with Al Ahly, with whom he won eight Egyptian Premier League titles, four Egypt Cups, four Egyptian Super Cups, four CAF Champions League titles, three CAF Super Cups, one Arab Club Champions Cup, and two Arab Super Cups.

Third on the list of all-time appearances for Egypt, El Hadary made 159 international appearances for his nation between 1996 and 2018. He won the Africa Cup of Nations four times, and was named the tournament's best goalkeeper on three occasions. In the 2018 World Cup, at the age of 45 years and 161 days, he became the oldest player in history to play in a World Cup match.

After his retirement, he was very close to being the goalkeeping coach of Étoile Sahel of Tunisia, to be part of the technical staff under the leadership of Jorvan Vieira after agreeing to sign the contract, but he was forced to retreat in the end due to his mother's illness.

Club career
El Hadary was born in Kafr El Battikh, Damietta. His father was a craftsman who owned his own workshop making furniture. El Hadary took up playing football without his parents' knowledge, washing his muddy clothes in a local river after playing in order to avoid them knowing. He was spotted by his local football team before being signed by Second Division club Damietta at age 17. He made his first team debut for Damietta in 1993 at the age of 20, and after two seasons signed a pre-contract with Egyptian champions Al Ahly. In 12 years at the Cairo club he won eight Egyptian Premier League titles, four Egypt Cups, four Egyptian Super Cups, four CAF Champions League titles, three CAF Super Cups, one Arab Club Champions Cup, and two Arab Super Cups.

Swiss club FC Sion announced that they had signed El Hadary on a four-year contract in February 2008, despite objections from his club, Al Ahly, due to the fact that he was still under contract with them.  El Hadary was fined and suspended by Al Ahly, before world governing body FIFA gave permission for Sion to complete the deal.

In 2009, FIFA suspended El Hadary and penalized Sion, even though he had already decided to return to Egypt.  In July, while his suspension was stayed by the Court of Arbitration for Sport (CAS), El Hadary moved to Egyptian Premier League side Ismaily.  In 2010, his four month suspension was upheld by the CAS, and in January a Swiss civil court upheld the ban and fines and additionally ordered him to pay FIFA's court costs.

In December 2010, after a brief stint with Zamalek SC, El Hadary moved to Sudanese club Al-Merreikh.  After boycotting practices due to a pay dispute, he was loaned to Al-Ittihad Alexandria, but after a stadium riot in Port Said led to the suspension of the 2011–12 Egyptian Premier League season he returned to Sudan again. 

After his contract with Al-Merreikh expired, he returned to Egypt, joining Wadi Degla in 2013, moving back to Ismaily in 2014, and returning again to Wadi Degla in 2015.  Throughout this period, he continued to be acclaimed one of the best footballers ever to play for Egypt or anywhere in Africa; in 2013 he was included in Bleacher Report's "50 Greatest African Players of All Time" list, ranked number 6.

In 2017, an argument with a teammate led to El Hadary being thrown off the Wadi Degla team briefly. In June of that year, he signed for Al-Taawoun to become the first foreign goalkeeper to play in Saudi Arabia.

On 2 July 2018, it was confirmed that El Hadary had joined Ismaily for the third time in his career.

On 28 January 2019, El Hadary signed with Nogoom. However, he left the club following their relegation at the end of the season.

On 18 November 2020, El Hadary announced his official retirement in order to start his coaching career.

International career
El Hadary represented Egypt a total of 159 times from his debut in 1996 until his retirement in 2018. He won the African Cup of Nations four times with his country. He was chosen as the best goalkeeper in the 2006 African Cup of Nations, held in homeland Egypt, in the 2008 African Cup of Nations, held in Ghana and for the 2010 African Cup of Nations, held in Angola.

In January 2013, his agent tweeted that El Hadary had retired from international football after being benched for a run of games, being the 23rd most capped international player in history and also the player with most African Cup of Nations titles. He returned to the national team in a match against Bosnia Herzegovina on 5 March 2014, winning 2–0.

On 4 June 2016, El Hadary played the full 90 minutes in a 2–0 win against Tanzania which secured Egypt's qualification for 2017 Africa Cup of Nations. On 17 January 2017, two days after his 44th birthday, he became the oldest player to ever appear in an Africa Cup of Nations match after replacing Ahmed El-Shenawy in Egypt's first match of the tournament then on 5 February 2017 on a final match of the tournament against Cameroon he was then 44 years and 21 days.
On 1 February 2017, El Hadary saved two penalties as Egypt defeated Burkina Faso 4–3 in a penalty shoot-out to advance to the 2017 Africa Cup of Nations Final.

In June 2018, at the age of 45, he was named in Egypt's 23-man squad for the 2018 FIFA World Cup in Russia. He was the oldest of all players selected for the tournament, beating the record set by Colombian goalkeeper Faryd Mondragón in the previous edition of the tournament. On 25 June, El Hadary was handed a start in Egypt's final group match against Saudi Arabia to become the oldest player ever to play in and debut at a World Cup at the age of 45 years and 161 days, once again breaking Mondragón's record of 43 years and three days. El Hadary stopped a penalty kick in the first half of the match, but subsequently conceded from a second penalty just before half time; his team eventually lost the game 2–1 after conceding a goal in stoppage time.

On 7 August 2018, El Hadary announced his international retirement at the age of 45, having made 159 international appearances for Egypt. In November 2019, the FIFA World Football Museum exhibited El Hadary's gloves of his World Cup match for being the tournament's oldest player and first African goalkeeper ever to save a penalty.

Post-playing career
In September 2021, El Hadary became the goalkeeping coach of Egypt national team until March 2022, before joining Rogério Micale's Egypt U23 staff in August 2022. In February 2023, he became part of Héctor Cúper's coaching staff of Syria national team.

Career statistics

International
Sources:

Honours 
Al Ahly
 Egyptian Premier League: 1996–97, 1997–98, 1998–99, 1999–2000, 2004–05, 2005–06, 2006–07
 Egypt Cup: 2000–01, 2002–03, 2005–06, 2006–07
 Egyptian Super Cup: 2003, 2005, 2006, 2007
 CAF Champions League: 2001, 2005, 2006
 CAF Super Cup: 2002, 2006, 2007

Sion
Swiss Cup: 2008–09

Al Merreikh
 Sudan Premier League: 2011
 Sudan Cup: 2012
Egypt
 Africa Cup of Nations: 1998, 2006, 2008, 2010
 Pan Arab Games: 2007

Egypt Military
 World Military Cup: 2001

Egypt U23
 All-Africa Games: 1995

Individual
 CAF Champions League Best Goalkeeper: 2001, 2005, 2006
 Africa Cup of Nations Best Goalkeeper: 2006, 2008, 2010, 2017

See also
List of footballers with 100 or more caps

References

Notes

External links

1973 births
Living people
Egyptian footballers
People from Damietta
Egypt international footballers
Egyptian expatriate footballers
Association football goalkeepers
Al Ahly SC players
1999 FIFA Confederations Cup players
2009 FIFA Confederations Cup players
1998 African Cup of Nations players
2006 Africa Cup of Nations players
2008 Africa Cup of Nations players
2010 Africa Cup of Nations players
FC Sion players
Swiss Super League players
FIFA Century Club
2000 African Cup of Nations players
2002 African Cup of Nations players
Al-Merrikh SC players
Africa Cup of Nations-winning players
Wadi Degla SC players
2017 Africa Cup of Nations players
Al-Taawoun FC players
Saudi Professional League players
Expatriate footballers in Saudi Arabia
Expatriate footballers in Switzerland
Expatriate footballers in Sudan
Egyptian expatriate sportspeople in Saudi Arabia
Egyptian expatriate sportspeople in Switzerland
Egyptian Premier League players
2018 FIFA World Cup players
Ismaily SC players
Zamalek SC players
Al Ittihad Alexandria Club players
Damietta SC players
Egyptian expatriate sportspeople in Sudan
Nogoom FC players